Welcome the Stranger is a 2018 American mystery thriller film written and directed by Justin Kelly, who also produced the film with Jordan Yale Levine, Scott Levinson, Thor Bradwell, Gina Gammell, and Riley Keough. It stars Abbey Lee, Caleb Landry Jones, and Keough.

Synopsis
When Alice (Abbey Lee) arrives unannounced at her estranged brother Ethan's (Caleb Landry Jones) house in an attempt to reconcile, bizarre visions and the return of Ethan's strange girlfriend, Misty (Riley Keough), begin to spark paranoia and suspicion. As the haunting visions become more peculiar, the two siblings desperately cling to reality, but are forced to face the mysterious circumstances.

Cast
 Abbey Lee as Alice
 Caleb Landry Jones as Ethan
 Riley Keough as Misty
 Rosemary Howard as Housekeeper
 John Clofine as Danny (Housekeeper's Son)

Production
In July 2016, it was announced that Riley Keough, Caleb Landry Jones, and Abbey Lee had joined the cast of the film, with Justin Kelly writing, directing, and producing the film alongside Keough, Scott Levinson, Jordan Yale Levine, Thor Bradwell, and Gina Gammell under their Yale Productions and Digital Ignition Entertainment banners respectively.

Filming
Principal photography began in July 2016, in Kingston, New York.

Release
The film was released through video on demand on March 20, 2018, by Sony Pictures Home Entertainment.

References

External links
 

2018 films
2018 direct-to-video films
2018 thriller films
2010s mystery thriller films
American direct-to-video films
American mystery thriller films
Direct-to-video thriller films
Films shot in New York (state)
Sony Pictures direct-to-video films
2010s English-language films
2010s American films